Dave Dornseif (born August 12, 1956) is an American former professional ice hockey player who played in the World Hockey Association (WHA). He was drafted in the ninth round of the 1976 NHL Amateur Draft by the St. Louis Blues and the fourth round of the 1976 WHA Amateur Draft by the Indianapolis Racers. He played parts of two seasons with the Racers and Cincinnati Stingers.

References

External links

1956 births
Living people
American men's ice hockey defensemen
Cincinnati Stingers players
Ice hockey players from Minnesota
Sportspeople from Edina, Minnesota
Indianapolis Racers draft picks
Indianapolis Racers players
Providence Friars men's ice hockey players
St. Louis Blues draft picks